Catch 22 is an American ska punk band from East Brunswick Township, New Jersey. 
The band was formed in 1996 by guitarist/vocalist/songwriter Tomas Kalnoky, who left the band in 1998 and later formed Streetlight Manifesto. Founding members still in the band are vocalist/saxophonist Ryan Eldred, trumpeter Kevin Gunther and drummer Chris Greer. While largely inactive since 2012, the band performed at a spate of shows in 2015.

Biography
Catch 22 was formed by guitarist/vocalist Tomas Kalnoky and drummer Chris Greer who recruited trumpeter Kevin Gunther, who was working in a local record store. Bassist Josh Ansley, saxophonist Ryan Eldred, and trombonist James Egan, who was also Kevin Gunther's first music teacher, rounded out the original lineup.
The band released a self-produced demo tape, Rules of the Game, in 1996. All 2000 copies of the tape quickly sold out. The band mailed several copies to labels they were interested in working with including Gainesville, Florida's Toybox Records (who had previously released a 7" by Less Than Jake). Toybox was owned and operated by Sean Bonner, who had recently moved to Chicago, Illinois to work at Victory Records. Sean brought the tape to the Victory office and suggested the band be signed.

The band then signed to Victory and produced their first studio album, 1998's Keasbey Nights. Ansley left and was replaced by Pat Calpin. Kalnoky left the band shortly thereafter, deciding (due in part to parental pressure) to continue his education rather than tour. Catch 22 continued on with Pat Calpin moving to guitar, Pat "Mingus" Kays on bass, and Jeff Davidson on vocals. After recording the Washed UP! EP, Egan left the band to continue his teaching career and focus on family life. Alone in a Crowd followed in 2000 with Mike Soprano on trombone. After this release, the band began touring heavily on a national scale, appearing with Mustard Plug, Reel Big Fish, and other third-wave ska, hardcore, and punk acts.
Davidson and Soprano left the band in 2001 to pursue other projects, and for a while the band actively courted new vocalists, even putting an advertisement on their website. The group also recruited Ian McKenzie, formerly of Long Island, New York ska band Edna's Goldfish on trombone/vocals.

After a fruitless search, the band decided to continue on as it was, with Ryan Eldred and Kevin Gunther sharing vocal duties. Washed Up and Through the Ringer, an expansion of the Washed Up! EP, was released in 2001, featuring two new songs, three rarities from the Alone In A Crowd era, and a handful of live tracks recorded in October 2000 at Club Laga in Pittsburgh and Euclid Tavern in Ohio.

The band released its third full-length album, Dinosaur Sounds, in 2003, roughly the same time Streetlight Manifesto (a band founded by Tomas Kalnoky and featuring Josh Ansley, Jamie Egan, and Jim Conti as well as former members of the NJ ska band One Cool Guy) released their debut album Everything Goes Numb. Both albums featured supposed veiled attacks on each other, suggesting to many fans that there was some sort of disagreement or heat between Catch 22 and Streetlight Manifesto. While there was a disagreement, the two parties have since reconciled their differences. Catch 22's Kevin Gunther has since been in charge of Streetlight Manifesto's tour booking for many years, and members of both bands have said in conversations with fans that there is no "beef" between the two.

In 2004, Catch 22 released Live, a combination CD and DVD recording of a show performed at The Downtown in Farmingdale, New York, earlier that year.

In 2006 they released their fourth studio album, Permanent Revolution.

Several bands who opened for Catch 22 in the past have gone on to find fame on the mainstream, including Sum 41, Bowling for Soup, and Taking Back Sunday.

In April 2009, the band embarked on a European tour, which included a performance at the Groezrock festival. They played a few Northeastern US shows in August 2009.

In July 2010, former vocalist Jeff Davidson returned as a guest performer to sing a few songs at one show, making it his first performance with the band since 2001. After a few East Coast shows, the band went on a European tour through to August 2010.

In February 2012, Catch 22's official website showed that they would be making an appearance at Bamboozle 2012. After this the band has been inactive, but not officially broken up.

In February 2015, Catch 22 was listed as a performer for Amnesia Rockfest in Montebello, Quebec.

On January 30, 2016 Jeff Davidson joined the band to perform Alone In A Crowd in full at Starland Ballroom in Sayreville, NJ.

Music
When Tomas Kalnoky was still the band's songwriter, the band had a traditional ska punk sound, and their album Keasbey Nights was one of the most recognized third wave ska albums of the time. During this time, Kalnoky was the band's primary vocalist, while Kevin Gunther provided most of the backing vocals. Keasbey Nights also featured many different instruments not found on later albums, played by James Egan.

After Kalnoky, Egan and Ansley had departed, saxophonist Ryan Eldred became the band's primary songwriter, sharing lyric duties with new lead vocalist Jeff Davidson, and Eldred also became the band's third vocalist. The band's sound changed more towards a punk rock sound, while still retaining the band's ska punk roots. The album Alone in a Crowd also relied heavily on backing vocals and threeway vocal harmonies provided by Jeff Davidson, Kevin Gunther and Ryan Eldred.

After the departure of Jeff Davidson, both Eldred and Gunther took over lead vocal duties. The older material was distributed evenly between the two, but Eldred was selected as main vocalist for the band's new songs. The album Dinosaur Sounds saw the band's sound depart even more from ska punk, towards alternative rock, which resulted in the alienation of some fans.

2006's Permanent Revolution saw the band return to its ska punk roots, while also borrowing influences from jazz, reggae and alternative rock. The album was also a concept album, one of the first in the ska punk scene.

Members

Current
Ryan Eldred – Tenor Saxophone, Backing Vocals (1996–present); Lead Vocals (2001–present)
Kevin Gunther – Trumpet, Backing Vocals, Lead Vocals (1996–present)
Pat Calpin – Guitar, Backing Vocals (1998–present); Bass (1998)
James Egan – Trombone, flute, Backing vocals (1996–1999,2019–present)
Chris Greer – Drums (1996–present)
Mike Corvasce - Bass (2019–present)

Former
Tomas Kalnoky – Lead vocals, guitar (1996–1998)
Jeff Davidson – Lead vocals (1998–2001)
Jason Scharenguivel – Bass, Backing Vocals (1996–1997)
Josh Ansley – Bass, Backing vocals (1996–1998)
Mike Soprano – Trombone, backing vocals (1999–2001)
Ian McKenzie – Trombone, backing vocals (2001–2014)
"Mingus" Pat Kays – Bass, Backing Vocals (1998–2019)
Dave Solomon – Trombone, Backing Vocals (2015–2019)

Timeline

Discography

Studio albums
Keasbey Nights (1998)
Alone in a Crowd (2000)
Dinosaur Sounds (2003)
Permanent Revolution (2006)

Live records
Live (2004)

EPs
Rules of the Game (EP) (1996)
Washed Up! (1999)

Singles
"Party Song" (2006)

Music videos
 "Keasbey Nights" (1998)
 "Point the Blame" (2000)
 "Hard to Impress" (2001)
 "Wine Stained Lips" (2003)
 "Party Song" (2006)

References

External links
Official website
Record label

Musical groups established in 1996
Musical groups from New Jersey
People from East Brunswick, New Jersey
Third-wave ska groups
Victory Records artists
American ska musical groups
Articles which contain graphical timelines